WINN 104.9 FM is a radio station broadcasting a Hot Adult Contemporary format. Licensed to Columbus, Indiana, the station is owned by White River Broadcasting Co., Inc.

History
104.9 FM signed on January 30, 1975, as WWWY-FM. It became WINN-FM in late 2001.

The radio station has had various different formats throughout its history.  It had a Classic Hits format branded as 104.9 The River from 2007? until July 2, 2012, when it became a Hot Adult Contemporary Format.  The Classic Hits format is now on WWWY branded at 106.1 The River.

References

External links
WINN's official website

  

INN